Eparchy of Kyiv is central eparchy of the Ukrainian Orthodox Church (Moscow Patriarchate) under the supreme ecclesiastical jurisdiction of the Russian Orthodox Church.

The seat of Eparchy is in Kyiv. Eparchy is primatial, its head being the Metropolitan of Kyiv and all Ukraine. Since 2014, office is held by Metropolitan Onufriy (Berezovsky).

History
The eparchy claims its heritage to the original eparchy of Kyiv that dates back to the establishment of the Old Russian (Ruthenian) Church under the jurisdiction of Ecumenical Patriarchate of Constantinople. Old Russian (Ruthenian) Kyiv diocese (or archdiocese) is first mentioned in 891, as the 60th by ranks of honor in the list of departments subordinate to the Patriarch of Constantinople, and 61st in the charter of Emperor Leo (886-911). From its beginnings, eparchy of Kyiv was central or primatial diocese of the Metropolitanate, which also included a number of other dioceses, created after the baptism of Kievan Rus during the rule of Great Prince Vladimir in 988.

In reality the eparchy history starts since 1685–1686, when the eparchy of Kyiv, along with all the Metropolitan of Kyiv, has been "transferred" from the Patriarchate of Constantinople to the Moscow.

By Tsar Peter I the Metropolitan of Kyiv in the early 18th century became known as archbishop. This lasted until the middle of the century, when the decree of Empress Elizabeth Petrovna, they were again granted the dignity of the Metropolitan. In the 17th and 18th centuries, Kyiv diocese consisted of two parts on the right and left banks of the Dnieper River, within subsequently ceded to Chernihiv and Poltava provinces. Most of the diocese called itself "the Diocese of Kyiv" and smaller - "Abroad". The jurisdiction of the metropolitan of Kyiv in the 18th century, was chaplain of Warsaw within Poland.

Since 1918, the decision of the All-Russian Church Council of 1917-1918 Kyiv bishops again become the heads of not only the diocese, but the Church and the autonomous region within Ukraine. After its liquidation by order of Patriarch Tikhon was established Ukrainian Exarchate. The Bishops' Council of the Russian Orthodox Church, 25–27 October 1990, established autonomous and self-governing Ukrainian Orthodox Church, with its primatial Diocese of Kyiv, managed since 1992 by Metropolitan Volodymyr Sabodan who died in 2014.

Ruling bishops
 Gedeon Chetvertinsky
 Varlaam Jasinsky
 Joasaph Krokovsky
 Varlaam Vonatovich
 Raphael Zaborovsky
 Timothy Shcherbatsky
 Arsenius Mohylansky
 Gavril Kremenetsky
 Hilarion Kondratovsky (acting)
 Samuel Myslavsky
 Hierothenius Malitsky
 Gavril Bănulescu-Bodoni
 Serapion Aleksandrovsky
 Yevgeny Bolkhovitinov
 Filaret Amfiteatrov
 Isidore Nikolsky
 Arsenius Moskvin
 Filothy Uspiensky
 Platon Gorodetsky
 Joannicius Rudniev
 Silvester Malevansky (acting)
 Theognost Lebiediev
 Flavian Gorodetsky
 Vladimir Bogoyavlensky
 Nicodemus (Krotkov) (acting)
 Antony (Khrapovitsky)
 Nazarius Blinov (acting)
 Michael Yermakov (acting)
 Vasilius Bogdashevsky (acting)
 Makarius Karmazin (acting)
 Michael Yermakov
 Sergius Kuminsky (acting)
 Georgius Dieliyev (acting)
 Dimitrius Verbitsky
 Sergius Grishin
 Constantine Dyakov
 Alexander Petrovsky (acting)
 Nicholas (Yarushevich)
 Nazi occupation (Ukrainian Autonomous Orthodox Church, Panteleimon Rudyk)
 John Sokolov
 Joasaph Leliukhin
 Alipius Khotovitsky (acting)
 Filaret (Denysenko)
 Nicodemus (Rusnak) (acting)
 Volodymyr Sabodan
 Onufriy (Berezovsky)

References

External links
 Monasteries and Convents of Kiev Diocese — UOC Synod Commission for Monasteries
 Google-map: Monasteries and Convents of Kiev Diocese — UOC Synod Commission for Monasteries

Kiev
Ukrainian Orthodox Church (Moscow Patriarchate)
Eastern Orthodox dioceses in Ukraine